WNUR-FM (89.3 MHz) is a non-commercial FM radio station licensed to Evanston, Illinois and serving the Chicago metropolitan area. It is the student radio station of Northwestern University and has a college radio format, mixing different styles of music with news and commentary.

WNUR-FM has an effective radiated power (ERP) of 7,200 watts.  The transmitter is off Sheridan Road in Evanston, near the Northwestern University Library.

History
WNUR first began broadcasting as a low-power campus AM radio station in the 1940s. Originally, WNUR-FM operated from a 10-watt transmitter that only could be heard on or near the campus. By the 1970s, it got a power boost to 7,200 watts, allowing it to be heard in parts of Chicago and its northern suburbs.

Between 1982 and 1995, WNUR's slogan was "The New Music FM".  In 1995, the station moved into new facilities in Northwestern's Annie May Swift Hall.  Around that same time, WNUR's slogan switched to "Chicago's Sound Experiment". (The station had previously broadcast from older facilities in the basement of the same building). In March 2007, WNUR began broadcasting from studios in John J. Louis Hall on Northwestern's Evanston Campus.

On-air programming

Music programs
WNUR programming over the years has included Airplay (a weekly program dedicated to local Chicago music), free-form experimental audio collage programming, weekly live radio comedies, and world-premiere live radio dramas written and directed by David Mamet. Current programming blocks focus on news, music (including classical, folk, hip-hop, jazz, and rock), individual shows such as This is Hell.

Rock Show specializes in independent, experimental and underground music. DJs play no wave, punk, musique concrète, post-punk, noise, noise rock, and related styles. Notable alumni of the programming block include Steve Albini and the Arcade Fire's William Butler.

Jazz Show specializes in independent, experimental and underground music, and emphasizes new and local releases. DJs on this programming block play Free Jazz, free improvisation, noise, and related styles.

Sports coverage
WNUR Sports carries Northwestern Wildcats football, baseball, and men's basketball. Since the mid-1990s, WNUR has been the exclusive carrier of Northwestern Wildcats women's basketball. In addition, WNUR often covers Wildcats women's lacrosse, softball, as well as a handful of Northwestern Wildcats volleyball, soccer, and field hockey games. WNUR Sports has carried every Northwestern football game since at least 1995, and many NCAA women's lacrosse championship games.

WNUR Sports is a distinct entity that operates on its own budget, separate from the WNUR operating budget. WNUR Sports has served as the exclusive carrier of Northwestern Men's Basketball for several tournaments that flagship station WGN 720 AM was unable to cover, including the 2006 San Juan Shootout hosted by the University of Puerto Rico at Mayagüez and the 2005 BCA Invitational at the University of Wyoming. WNUR Sports also provides sideline reports for all football broadcasts. WNUR Sports hosts a weekly call-in show known as The SportsVoice. The SportsVoice is the only call-in show dedicated to Northwestern Wildcat Athletics.  As with all WNUR Sports programming, it is hosted and produced entirely by students.

Off-air activities 
In addition to broadcasts, some station blocks focus on creating non-radio content. WNUR News and WNUR Sports both create their own podcasts and blog posts, while Airplay publishes live performance videos.

In 2019, the first volume of the station's music magazine Wavelength was published.

Alumni
DJs from WNUR have occasionally gone on to produce their own music. Alumni include music critic and sometimes musician John Corbett and members of several bands including OK Go, The Effigies, Arcade Fire, Town and Country, Chavez, Volcano! and the No Doctors. House DJs Derrick Carter and Mark Farina also held shows on WNUR in the early 1990s. Other alums include Neil Tesser, Steve Albini, Sarah Sherman and This American Life host Ira Glass got his start at the station. Arbitron executive Pierre Bouvard also hails from WNUR, as does radio researcher and strategist Mark Kassof. Kevin Beacham, host of Redefinition Radio on Minnesota Public Radio's independent music station, KCMP, hosted the hip-hop program Time Travel on WNUR during the mid-1990s. In the late 1970s, novelist Eckhard Gerdes was a DJ, Free Form Producer, and Rock Producer at the station.

Alumni of WNUR Sports include Guy Benson of WIND, Dave Eanet of WGN, Glenn Geffner of the Florida Marlins, Dave Revsine of the Big Ten Network, Kevin Blackistone of Fanhouse.com and ESPN, and Darren Rovell of CNBC.

References

External links
WNUR Records, 1953-1994, Northwestern University Archives, Evanston, Illinois
WNUR History Site
Underground Archive Project, documenting over 1,000 albums from the WNUR music library

NUR
Northwestern University
Evanston, Illinois
NUR-FM
Radio stations established in 1948
1948 establishments in Illinois